In mathematics, the Weierstrass functions are special functions of a complex variable that are auxiliary to the Weierstrass elliptic function.  They are named for Karl Weierstrass. The relation between the sigma, zeta, and  functions is analogous to that between the sine, cotangent, and squared cosecant functions: the logarithmic derivative of the sine is the cotangent, whose derivative is negative the squared cosecant.

Weierstrass sigma function

The Weierstrass sigma function associated to a two-dimensional lattice  is defined to be the product

Through careful manipulation of the Weierstrass factorization theorem as it relates also to the sine function, another potentially more manageable infinite product definition is

Weierstrass zeta function

The Weierstrass zeta function is defined by the sum

The Weierstrass zeta function is the logarithmic derivative of the sigma-function. The zeta function can be rewritten as:

where  is the Eisenstein series of weight 2k + 2.

The Weierstrass zeta function should not be confused with the Riemann zeta function in number theory.

Weierstrass eta function
The Weierstrass eta function is defined to be
 and any w in the lattice 

This is well-defined, i.e.  only depends on the lattice vector w. The Weierstrass eta function should not be confused with either the Dedekind eta function or the Dirichlet eta function.

Weierstrass ℘-function

The Weierstrass p-function is related to the zeta function by 

The Weierstrass ℘-function is an even elliptic function of order N=2 with a double pole at each lattice point and no other poles.

Degenerate case
Consider the situation where one period is real, which we can scale to be  and the other is taken to the limit of  so that the functions are only singly-periodic. Then we have  and thus from the above infinite product definition the following equality:

A generalization for other sine-like functions on other doubly-periodic lattices is

Elliptic functions
Analytic functions